Bay City is an unincorporated community in Grays Harbor County, in the U.S. state of Washington.

History
A post office called Bay City was established in 1884. The community was named for nearby South Bay.

References

Unincorporated communities in Grays Harbor County, Washington
Unincorporated communities in Washington (state)